Girls is a 1980 film directed by Just Jaeckin. The film is about four teenage friends who experience the trials and tribulations of maturing into women.  The film was a French, West German and Canadian co-production, with funding from the French Society of International Co-productions, FFF - French Movies (Paris), The Caneuram Films (Montreal), TV13 Filmproduktion (Munich).

Cast
 Anne Parillaud as Catherine Flavin
 Zoé Chauveau as Annie
 Charlotte Walior as Suzanne, Betty's sister
 Isabelle Mejias as Betty
 Christophe Bourseiller as Bernard
 Étienne Chicot as The Host

Production
Girls was shot in Montreal in Canada and in Normandy and Paris in France. The soundtrack for the film was recorded by Eric Stewart of 10cc.

Release
Girls was released in Paris on May 7, 1980 and June 27, 1980 in West Germany. The film was shown for 9 weeks in Paris. In Canada, the film premiered in Montreal on October 2, 1981. The film was distributed by Les Productions Karim in Montreal and released in both French and an English dub.

Notes

External links

1980 films
French coming-of-age drama films
Canadian coming-of-age drama films
West German films
German coming-of-age drama films
French teen drama films
Canadian teen drama films
German teen drama films
Films directed by Just Jaeckin
1980s coming-of-age drama films
1980s French-language films
French-language Canadian films
1980s Canadian films
1980s French films
1980s German films